Urakayevo (Uraqay) is a rural locality (a village) in Bayguzinsky Selsoviet, Yanaulsky District, Bashkortostan, Russia. The population was 173 as of 2010. There are 4 streets.

Geography 
Urakayevo is located 14 km southwest of Yanaul (the district's administrative centre) by road. Gudburovo is the nearest rural locality.

References 

Rural localities in Yanaulsky District